Shirley Plantation is an estate on the north bank of the James River in Charles City County, Virginia. It is located on scenic byway State Route 5, between Richmond and Williamsburg. It is the oldest active plantation in Virginia and the oldest family-owned business in North America, dating back to 1614 with operations starting in 1648. It used about 70 to 90 enslaved people at a time for forced labor including plowing the fields, cleaning, childcare, and cooking. It was added to the National Register in 1969 and declared a National Historic Landmark in 1970.

History

The lands of Shirley Plantation were first settled by Europeans in 1613 by Sir Thomas West, 3rd Baron De La Warr and were named West and Sherley Hundred, probably because this Lord Delaware's wife Cessalye was the daughter of Sir Thomas Sherley (variant spellings being common at the time). Several years later, John Rolfe wrote A True Relation of the State of Virginia left by Sir Thomas Dale Knight in May last 1616. He named it one of six European settlements in the colony and noted that Captain Isaac Maddeson commanded 25 laborers and farmers . It survived the native American uprising of March 22, 1622 relatively unscathed, and became for a while the westernmost settlement on the north side of the James river. The tobacco was shipped within the colonies and to England. A report in 1623 found the West and Sherlow Hundred had 45 men, women, and children, with an additional 24 (including Francis West) at the "Iland" (modern Eppes Island in the James River, visible from the manor house).

In 1638, Edward Hill acquired part of this land, thus beginning the occupation by the Hill family. His original  plot was expanded by marriage and gradual land acquisition. In 1660, Hill patented  in Charles City County, including the  island. When he died several years later, the land passed to Edward Hill II who continued as owner during Bacon's Rebellion in 1676. One of these two men built what became called the Hill house, the first mansion at Shirley, and which was torn down . The younger Hill sided with Governor William Berkeley, and Bacon's rebels plundered the property, perhaps in part because the King's commissioners who later examined the rebellion found him to be "the most hated man of all the county where he lived". Hill was also the subject of the "Charles City Grievances" of May 10, 1677, which accused him of misappropriating county taxes for his own use.

His son Edward Hill III inherited the property in 1700 and continued its plantation economy. However, Edward Hill III's only son, Edward Hill IV, died at 16 of consumption, leaving no male heirs and only three sisters. Edward Hill III died in 1726, and his will bequeathed Shirley plantation to his youngest daughter, Elizabeth who had married John Carter (eldest son of Robert "King" Carter), in October 1723. When he died in 1742, his widow remarried, to Bowler Cocke, who represented nearby Henrico County and helped raise the heir, future burgess and patriot Charles Hill Carter (1732-1806).

The construction of the present mansion and outbuildings began . The mansion, called the "Great House", was completed in 1738 and was located close to the original house built by the Hills that became known as the "Hill House". In 1868, owners signed a contract to demolish the Hill House and use its salvaged building materials to construct the mansion at Upper Shirley.

At least eight generations of the Hill Carter family have occupied the house since 1738. Anne Hill Carter was born at Shirley, who on June 18, 1793, married Henry "Light Horse Harry" Lee in the mansion's parlor. The couple were later parents of Confederate General Robert E. Lee.

The plantation used enslaved people to cultivate cash crops, particularly after the mid-17th century when the flow of indentured servants from England became very few. According to the first Virginia tax census following the American Revolutionary War, in 1787, Charles Hill Carter owned 67 enslaved people above age 16 at Shirley Plantation and another 67 younger slaves, along with 16 horses and 70 cattle; and he owned another 16 adult slaves and 22 enslaved children and additional livestock at his Long Bridge plantation in the same county. In the 19th century, an annual staff of between 70 and 90 enslaved African-Americans were forced to labor on the plantation, including plowing the fields, cleaning, and cooking.

In 1866, Charles Hill Carter's son and heir, Hill Carter, was forced to retire and divide his estate after he lost the free labor of enslaved people, with the bulk of the estate (the current Shirley Plantation) bequeathed to his son, Robert, and the 'Upper Shirley' portion bequeathed to William Fitzhugh Carter. Upper Shirley is now home to Upper Shirley Vineyards.  

The house was placed on the National Register in 1969 and recognized as a National Historic Landmark in 1970. In mid-1979 and mid-1980, teams of archaeologists from the College of William and Mary excavated the site of Hill house, the slave quarters constructed , and indigenous settlements predating European colonization. The upper floors are occupied by members of the eleventh generation of the Hill Carter family, while the bottom floor is open for tours.

Architecture
The three story "Great House" is constructed in the Georgian style with red brick walls and white trim boards on a square foundation. The house has no actual front door, as both the riverside and courtyard side entrances have a two-story portico with Doric columns supporting a pediment. The entrance is located in the center, framed by a pair of long rectangular windows on either side. Inside the main hall, the house’s famous carved walnut “floating” or “flying” cantilevered staircase rises for three stories without visible means of support, and is the only one of its kind in America. The hipped roof rests on an entablature containing dentil moldings. The roof is broken up by dormers and two large brick chimneys. In the center of the roof is a white pedestal supporting an overturned pineapple.

The house is surrounded by several support buildings, including a two-story kitchen with living quarters for the enslaved Africans, a two-story laundry with living quarters, a smokehouse, a stable building, an ice house, a large storehouse, and a dovecote.

Criticism 
A 1989 article criticized the failure of tour guides to discuss the historical existence of slavery and oppression on the estate. In it, the owner Helle Carter said she was most concerned about the "proud" local heritage while trying not to "step on anybody's toes", leaving visiting children to ask basic questions like "Where are the slave quarters? What did the slaves do?"

See also
List of oldest companies
List of National Historic Landmarks in Virginia
National Register of Historic Places listings in Charles City County, Virginia

References

Further reading

External links

 
 Historic American Buildings Survey photos: Pigeon house, brick outbuilding,  stable, quarters, log shed, smokehouse, log barn
James River Plantations, a National Park Service Discover Our Shared Heritage travel itinerary
Shirley, State Route 608 vicinity, Shirley, Charles City, VA: 21 photos, 5 data pages, and 2 photo caption pages at Historic American Buildings Survey
Shirley, Stable, State Route 608 vicinity, Shirley, Charles City, VA: 2 photos and 1 data page at Historic American Buildings Survey
Shirley, Dependency, State Route 608 vicinity, Shirley, Charles City, VA: 2 photos at Historic American Buildings Survey

Historic American Buildings Survey in Virginia
Houses on the National Register of Historic Places in Virginia
Antebellum architecture
Museums in Charles City County, Virginia
Carter family residences
James River plantations
National Historic Landmarks in Virginia
1613 establishments in Virginia
Houses completed in 1723
Historic house museums in Virginia
Georgian architecture in Virginia
Houses in Charles City County, Virginia
National Register of Historic Places in Charles City County, Virginia
West family
Plantation houses in Virginia
1723 establishments in the Thirteen Colonies
Family-owned companies of the United States